Standing order or standing orders may refer to:
 Standing order (banking) (or banker's order), instruction to a bank to pay a set amount at regular intervals from one account to another
 Permanent rules of order governing parliamentary procedure for an assembly; as opposed to sessional orders or orders of the day
 General order of unlimited duration, published by a military commander and binding on those commanded
 Collaborative practice agreement, between pharmacists and physicians for collaborative drug therapy management

See also
 Order (disambiguation)